Ding Sheng is a Chinese film director and screenwriter.  Born in Qingdao, Shandong in 1970 , his film works include Little Big Soldier, Police Story 2013 and Railroad Tigers (2016)  both films directed by him and starring Jackie Chan.

Filmography
Underdog Knight (2008) (Director)
Little Big Soldier (2010) (Director)
He-Man (2011) (Director, screenwriter, film editor)
Police Story 2013 (2013) (Director, screenwriter, film editor, man in taxi)
Saving Mr. Wu (2015) (Director)
Railroad Tigers (2016) (Director)
A Better Tomorrow 2018 (2018) (Director)

References

Living people
Film directors from Shandong
Chinese film directors
Year of birth missing (living people)